Martín Rubén Ríos (born 14 July 1977) is an Argentine professional footballer who plays as a goalkeeper for Deportivo Merlo.

Career
Villa Sanguinetti and Boca Juniors were Ríos' youth clubs. He played for Huracán between 1998 and 2003, making 140 appearances across various Argentine Primera División and Primera B Nacional campaigns. He departed the club in 2003 to join second tier Ferro Carril Oeste, with the goalkeeper subsequently being selected in eighty-two matches in over two years with them. 2006 saw Ríos join Ecuadorian Serie B side Universidad Católica. They were promoted to Serie A in his second of three seasons in Ecuador. Ríos agreed to play for Juventud Alianza of Torneo Argentino B in 2008.

After a stint with Deportivo Maipú, Ríos completed a move to Estudiantes in 2010. He remained for five seasons, participating in 163 Primera B Metropolitana fixtures; his last appearance was a promotion play-off semi-final defeat to Villa Dálmine on 29 November 2014. Ríos joined fellow third division side Brown on loan in the following January. He made 42 appearances in the 2015 campaign as Brown won the title and subsequent promotion to Primera B Nacional; finishing above his parent club by one point. Brown signed Ríos permanently in January 2016.

On 11 January 2022, 44-year old Ríos joined Primera B Metropolitana club Deportivo Merlo.

Career statistics
.

Honours
Huracán
Primera B Nacional: 1999–2000

Universidad Católica
Ecuadorian Serie B: 2007

Brown
Primera B Nacional: 2015

References

External links

1977 births
Living people
People from Arrecifes
Argentine footballers
Association football goalkeepers
Argentine expatriate footballers
Expatriate footballers in Ecuador
Argentine expatriate sportspeople in Ecuador
Argentine Primera División players
Primera Nacional players
Ecuadorian Serie B players
Ecuadorian Serie A players
Torneo Argentino B players
Torneo Argentino A players
Primera B Metropolitana players
Club Atlético Huracán footballers
Ferro Carril Oeste footballers
C.D. Universidad Católica del Ecuador footballers
Juventud Alianza players
Deportivo Maipú players
Estudiantes de Buenos Aires footballers
Club Atlético Brown footballers
Deportivo Merlo footballers
Sportspeople from Buenos Aires Province